Fernanda Andrea Sobarzo Aguilera is a Chilean model and beauty pageant titleholder who won Miss World Chile 2015 and represented Chile at Miss World 2015 pageant.

Pageantry

Miss Mundo Chile 2015
Fernanda, an engineering student in Diego Portales University has been crowned by Camila Andrade as Miss World Chile in a private event held in the Chilean Telethon Theatre. Sobarzo won Miss Elegance, Miss Photogenic and Miss Beauty with a Purpose award. Also she placed Top 6 in Sports and Fitness challenge and Top 5 in Miss Multimedia.

Miss World 2015
As Miss Mundo Chile, Sobarzo represented Chile in Miss World 2015 pageant, held in Sanya, China on December 19.

References 

Living people
Miss World Chile winners
Miss World 2015 delegates
Chilean female models
1994 births